Aurum Hotels was an Italian professional cycling team founded in 1996 and disbanded in 2007. Over the years the team included several stars such as Danilo Di Luca and Mario Cipollini.

Two of their sponsors later sponsored other teams: Acqua & Sapone ran from 2004 until 2012, while Domina Vacanze left the team in 2004 to sponsor the former De Nardi for the 2005 season.

1996 establishments in Switzerland
2007 disestablishments in Italy
Cycling teams based in Italy
Cycling teams based in Switzerland
Cycling teams disestablished in 2007
Cycling teams established in 1996
Defunct cycling teams based in Italy
Defunct cycling teams based in Switzerland